The following squads and players competed in the men's handball tournament at the 1992 Summer Olympics.

Brazil
The following players represented Brazil:

 José Luiz Aguiar e Ramalho
 Sérgio Carnasciali
 Drean Dutra
 Milton Fonseca Pelissari
 Rodrigo Hoffelder
 Osvaldo Inocente Filho
 Gilberto Cardoso
 José Luiz Vieira
 Ivan Bruno Maziero
 Marcelo Minhoto Ferraz de Sampaio
 Paulo Moratore
 José Ronaldo do Nascimento
 Cláudio Brito
 Edson Rizzo
 Head coach: Antonio Carlos Simoes

Czechoslovakia
The following players represented Czechoslovakia:

 Bohumír Prokop
 Ján Sedláček
 Ľubomír Švajlen
 Ľuboš Hudák
 Martin Šetlík
 Michal Tonar
 Milan Folta
 Petr Házl
 Peter Kakaščík
 Peter Kalafut
 Peter Mesiarik
 Petr Baumruk
 Roman Bečvář
 Václav Lanča
 Zdeněk Vaněk
 Zoltán Bergendi
 Head coach: Frantisek Sulc

Egypt
The following players represented Egypt:

 Hosam Abdallah
 Ayman Abdel Hamid Soliman
 Mohamed Abdel Mohamed
 Ahmed Belal
 Ahmed Debes
 Ahmed El-Attar
 Ahmed El-Awady
 Aser El-Kasaby
 Khaled El-Kordy
 Adel El-Sharkawy
 Ashraf Mabrouk Awaad
 Yasser Mahmoud
 Gohar Nabil
 Amer Serageldin
 Head coach: Paul Tiedemann

France
The following players represented France:

 Philippe Debureau
 Philippe Gardent
 Denis Lathoud
 Pascal Mahé
 Philippe Médard
 Gaël Monthurel
 Laurent Munier
 Frédéric Perez
 Alain Portes
 Thierry Perreux
 Éric Quintin
 Jackson Richardson
 Stéphane Stoecklin
 Jean-Luc Thiébaut
 Denis Tristant
 Frédéric Volle
 Head coach: Daniel Constantini

Germany
The following players represented Germany:

 Andreas Thiel
 Bernd Roos
 Frank-Michael Wahl
 Hendrik Ochel
 Holger Schneider
 Holger Winselmann
 Jan Holpert
 Jochen Fraatz
 Klaus-Dieter Petersen
 Matthias Hahn
 Michael Klemm
 Michael Krieter
 Richard Ratka
 Stephan Hauck
 Volker Zerbe
 Wolfgang Schwenke
 Head coach: Horst Bredemeier

Hungary
The following players represented Hungary:

 Attila Borsos
 Attila Horváth
 Ferenc Füzesi
 Igor Zubjuk
 Imre Bíró
 István Csoknyai
 Jakab Sibalin
 János Szathmári
 József Éles
 László Marosi
 László Sótonyi
 Mihály Iváncsik
 Ottó Csicsay
 Richárd Mezei
 Sándor Győrffy
 Head coach: Attila Joosz

Iceland
The following players represented Iceland:

 Bergsveinn Bergsveinsson
 Birgir Sigurðsson
 Einar Sigurðsson
 Geir Sveinsson
 Guðmundur Hrafnkelsson
 Gunnar Andrésson
 Gunnar Gunnarsson
 Héðinn Gilsson
 Jakob Sigurðsson
 Júlíus Jónasson
 Konráð Ólavsson
 Patrekur Jóhannesson
 Sigurður Bjarnason
 Valdimar Grímsson
 Head coach: Thorbergur Adalsteinsson

Romania
The following players represented Romania:

 Adi Popovici
 Alexandru Dedu
 Alexandru Buligan
 Costica Neagu
 Dumitru Berbece
 Sorin Toacsen
 Gheorghe Răduţă
 Rudi Prisăcaru
 Ion Mocanu
 Marian Dumitru
 Maricel Voinea
 Mitică Bontaş
 Robert Licu
 Cristian Zaharia
 Ionel Radu
 Head coach: Cezar Nica

South Korea
The following players represented South Korea:

 Jo Beom-yeon
 Jo Chi-hyo
 Jo Yeong-sin
 Choi Seok-jae
 Jeong Gang-uk
 Gang Jae-won
 Lee Gi-ho
 Lee Gyu-chang
 Lee Seon-sun
 Im Jin-seok
 Mun Byeong-uk
 Baek Sang-seo
 Park Do-heon
 Sim Jae-hong
 Yun Gyeong-sin
 Head coach: Kyu-Jung Lee

Spain
The following players represented Spain:

 Aitor Etxaburu
 Alberto Urdiales
 Aleix Franch
 Angel Hermida
 David Barrufet
 Enric Massip
 Fernando Bolea
 Iñaki Urdangarín
 Jaume Fort
 Juan Francisco Alemany
 Juan Javier Cabanas
 Juan Francisco Muñoz
 Lorenzo Rico
 Luis Eduardo García
 Mateo Garralda
 Ricardo Marín
 Head coach: Javier García Cuesta

Sweden
The following players represented Sweden:

 Magnus Andersson
 Robert Andersson
 Anders Bäckegren
 Per Carlén
 Magnus Cato
 Erik Hajas
 Robert Hedin
 Patrik Liljestrand
 Ola Lindgren
 Mats Olsson
 Staffan Olsson
 Axel Sjöblad
 Tommy Souraniemi
 Tomas Svensson
 Pierre Thorsson
 Magnus Wislander
 Head coach: Bengt Johansson

Unified Team
The following players represented the Unified Team:

 Andrey Barbashinsky
 Serhiy Bebeshko
 Igor Chumak
 Talant Duyshebaev
 Dmitry Filippov
 Yuriy Gavrilov
 Valery Gopin
 Vyacheslav Gorpishin
 Oleg Grebnev
 Oleg Kiselyov
 Vasily Kudinov
 Andrey Lavrov
 Andrey Minevski
 Pavel Sukosyan
 Igor Vasilev
 Mikhail Yakimovich
 Head coach: Spartak Mironovich

References

1992